Colin James Campbell Whalley (born 8 March 1941) is a former English field hockey player who represented the Great Britain men's national field hockey team at the 1968 Summer Olympics. He played hockey for Lancashire 153 times, and appeared for England 49 times. He later became the manager of the England team during the 1986 Men's Hockey World Cup, with England finishing as runners-up.

Whalley also played cricket at minor counties level for Cheshire from 1962–1965, making three appearances in the Minor Counties Championship.

References

External links
 

1941 births
Living people
Sportspeople from Wirral
English cricketers
Cheshire cricketers
English male field hockey players
Olympic field hockey players of Great Britain
Field hockey players at the 1968 Summer Olympics